Berezan Estuary, or Berezanskyi Liman, is open estuary on the northern coast of the Black Sea, western from the town Ochakiv. Length 26 km, width 4 km in south. Separated from the sea by sandbar, which has 640 m canal. Coasts are high. Two rivers, Berezan and Sasyk, inflow to the estuary.

See also
 Dniester Estuary
 Small Adzhalyk Estuary
 Khadzhibey Estuary
 Tylihul Estuary
 Sukhyi Estuary

Estuaries of Ukraine
Estuaries of the Black Sea